Bouchetia is a genus of sea snails, marine gastropod mollusks in the family Muricidae, the murex snails or rock snails.

This genus was named after the malacologist Philippe Bouchet. It has become a synonym of Paziella (Bouchetia) Houart & Héros, 2008, itself an alternate representation of Paziella Jousseaume, 1880

Species
Species within the genus Bouchetia included :
 Bouchetia hystricina (Dall, 1889): s
 Bouchetia vaubanensis (Houart, 1986): 
 Bouchetia wareni Houart & Héros, 2015

References

 Houart R. & Héros V. (2008) Muricidae (Mollusca: Gastropoda) from Fiji and Tonga. In: V. Héros, R.H. Cowie & P. Bouchet (eds), Tropical Deep-Sea Benthos 25. Mémoires du Muséum National d'Histoire Naturelle 196: 437-480. page(s): 450

External links
 Houart R. & Héros V. (2015). New species of Muricidae Rafinesque, 1815 (Mollusca: Gastropoda) from the Western Indian Ocean. Zoosystema. 37(3): 481-503

Muricidae